Sanjay Saini is a radiologist at Harvard Medical School. He was in the news in New York Times in 2003 in relation to collaboration with offshore radiologists to provide health care in America.

Saini earned his MD from Tufts Medical School, Boston, Massachusetts.   he is professor of radiology, at Harvard Medical School and Vice Chairman for Finance, Department of Radiology, at Massachusetts General Hospital, Boston, MA, USA.

See also 
Avtar Saini
Deep Saini
Subhash Saini
List of Saini people- Scholars and scientists

References

American people of Indian descent in health professions
American radiologists
Tufts University School of Medicine alumni
Harvard Medical School faculty
Date of birth unknown
Living people
Year of birth missing (living people)